Joe Kasper is an American football coach who currently serves as the Safeties coach for the Miami Dolphins.

Coaching career
In 2017, Kasper coached at John Carroll University. Kasper originally joined the Philadelphia Eagles as a defensive quality control coach during the 2021 offseason after spending the previous three years (2018–20) at Duke University. After the Eagle's loss in Super Bowl LV, the Dolphins hired Kasper as their new safeties coach, replacing Steve Gregory who was let go at the end of the season.

References

External links
 
 Baldwin Wallace profile
 Joe Kasper | Pro Football History.com

Year of birth missing (living people)
Living people
Baldwin Wallace Yellow Jackets football players
Cleveland Browns coaches
Duke Blue Devils football coaches
John Carroll Blue Streaks football coaches
Miami Dolphins coaches
Philadelphia Eagles coaches
People from Mentor, Ohio
Coaches of American football from Ohio
Players of American football from Ohio